Krasnaya Gorka is a rural locality (a selo) in Staromatinsky Selsoviet, Bakalinsky District, Bashkortostan, Russia. The population was 28 as of 2010. There is 1 street.

Geography 
Krasnaya Gorka is located 22 km northeast of Bakaly (the district's administrative centre) by road. Vorsinka is the nearest rural locality.

References 

Rural localities in Bakalinsky District